Purattasi Sani or Tirumala Shanivara is a Hindu festival celebrated in some parts of South India including Andhra Pradesh, Karnataka, Tamil Nadu and Kerala. The Hindu deity, Venkateswara, is worshiped during this festival. It is celebrated during the Tamil month of Purattasi, which generally falls in the months of September and October of the Gregorian calendar. Puratasi Masam is of great importance as it is believed that Lord Venkateswara appeared on the earth in this month. Lord Vishnu devotees consider this as the ideal month for thanking Lord Vishnu for preserving the Universe at the end of Kali Yuga. All the Saturdays of this month are treated as holy days and Devotees gather in large number at Lord Vishnu temples and special prayers are offered. Particularly the Odd Saturdays first, third, fifth are of more importance. Tirumala Annual Navarathri Brahmotsavam were also observed during this month where Tirumala will be flooded with lakhs of devotees. Some people will take only vegetarian food during this month.

Andhra Pradesh
This festival is celebrated majorly in south Andhra. This festival is celebrated grandly in Tirupati the foot hill town of Tirumala. People will wakeup early in the morning with Suprabhatam, the holy Sanskrit hyms to wakeup lord venkateswara. People will take headbath after which they will clean their houses and starts cooking special dishes (Naivedyam) to be offered to lord Venkateswara. Lord Venkateswara will be decorated with special flowers (includes Crysanthemum, jasmine, Hibiscus, Lilly, Lotus, Marigold and manymore), leaves (Thulasi maala (oscimum), mamidi aaku (mango leaves)), Fruits (Banana, Pine apple, Apple, Grapes, Papaya, Oranges, Musambi, Ground  Nuts, Kalimkayalu and manymore), money and TiruNaamam (Tilak with Namakommu and Sirisunnam).

Dishes include many varieties Laddu (The most beloved sweet of Lord Venkateswara), Bellam Pongali (Jaggary Pongal), Miryala Pongali (Pepper pongal), Panchamrutham, vada, Payasam, Pulihora, dardhojanam (curd rice), Guggullu, Dosa, Nuvvula pindi, Biyyam Pindi, Sugeelu, Mudha pappu, sambar, rasam, perugu (curd), neyyi (ghee), annam (rice).

During pooja first Deepam will be lit followed by offering naivedhyam, agarbathi, sambrani, coconut, harathi respectively. Naivedhyam will be offered to lord venkateswara and his wives, sri devi and bhu devi, on three banana leaves. Everyone in the house will keep tirunamam. During Harathi, everyone in the house utter the following hymns loudly:
EDU KONDALA VADA! VENKATA RAMANA! GOVINDHA! GOVINDHA!! 
APADHA MROKKULA VADA! ANADHA RAKSHAKA! GOVINDHA! GOVINDHA!!

Tiru Namam
TiruNamam also called as moodu namalu or Tirumala Namalu is a Namam which includes one base line drawn with namakommu (white in color) and three vertical lines on this base line of which first and second are drawn with namakommu one at beginning of base line and other at end of base line. The third vertical line is  made of sirisunnam (red in color) and is drawn from the middle of the base line.
Tirumala festivals
Tirumala Venkateswara Temple
Hindu festivals
Religious festivals in India